The Mount Savage Historic District is a national historic district in Mount Savage, Allegany County, Maryland.  It comprises 189 19th and 20th century buildings, structures, and sites within this industrial community northwest of Cumberland. The structures reflect the community's development as a center of the iron, coal, brick, and railroad industries from the 1830s to the early 20th century.  Included are a set of vertical-board duplexes on Old Row built about 1840, and possibly the earliest examples of workers' housing remaining in the region.

It was listed on the National Register of Historic Places in 1983.

See also
Mount Savage Iron Works
Mount Savage Locomotive Works
Mount Savage Railroad

References

External links
, including photo in 2002, at Maryland Historical Trust
Boundary Map of the Mount Savage Historic District, Allegany County, at Maryland Historical Trust

Historic districts on the National Register of Historic Places in Maryland
Historic districts in Allegany County, Maryland
Working-class culture in Maryland
National Register of Historic Places in Allegany County, Maryland